Chasing the Dime is a 2002 novel by American crime-writer Michael Connelly. It is his twelfth novel overall, and the only one to feature protagonist Henry Pierce. Themes explored in the book include grief, industrial espionage, and the modernization of prostitution over the internet.

The story is told in third-person narrative.

Plot summary 
After receiving a new phone number, Henry Pierce, the head of a nanotechnology firm Amedeo Technologies, begins to receive mysterious calls from men looking for a woman named Lilly. Pierce's company is working to create a molecular computer the size of a dime. Multiple other companies are involved in a race to this achievement. Pierce and his partner Charlie Condon have been preparing a presentation of their invention for a potential investor. At the same time, Pierce has recently been dumped by his girlfriend due to the distance caused by his work. After receiving more calls, Pierce decides to look into their origin to distract himself from his problems.

After getting the name of a website from one of the callers, Pierce discovers that Lilly is an escort available to purchase on a website titled L.A. Darlings. Visitors of the website have been attempting to contact her with her now out-of-date number. When his attempts to contact Lilly are futile, he calls another escort who partners with her, Robin. She tells him that she has not heard from her in a long time and hangs up on Pierce after seeing him as suspicious. Learning that the website is hosted by a company named Entrepreneurial Concepts Unlimited, ran by a man named Billy Wentz, Pierce visits its office in the morning. He finds Lilly's address, which is listed as a post office box. He enlists his personal assistant to call the post office and imitate Lilly to receive the true address. Pierce travels to the address, a bungalow in the suburbs. He enters through an unlocked door and finds rotting food and stacking mail from Lilly's mother. Pierce asks his friend from college Cody Zeller, a white hat hacker, to find what he can on Wentz. 

Pierce then sets an appointment to meet with Robin, who he bribes for any information she can give on Lilly. She tells him about Wentz and his boss, "Grady", and claims they are dangerous. She leads Pierce to Lilly's apartment. Inside, he finds a bloody mattress and calls the police. At the police station, Detective Renner questions Pierce, and it slowly becomes apparent that he is a suspect. After several hours, Pierce is let go, though when he returns to his car he suspects that it has been searched by the police. The next day, Pierce meets with a P.I. who previously investigated Lilly's disappearance for her mother. He warns Pierce to back off.

At his apartment complex, Pierce is stopped by two men who attack him and force him inside. They check his voicemail and then beat his face with the phone. The larger man, "Six-Eight", holds him by his ankles over the balcony twelve stories up. The smaller, who Pierce realizes is Wentz, demands that he stays away. Pierce is hospitalized and forced to undergo plastic surgery. Detective Renner visits him in the hospital and questions him, but becomes a threat to Pierce's innocence when he records a potentially incriminating statement out of context. To avoid going to court and ruining his company's image, Pierce seeks help from a lawyer. On the day of the presentation, Pierce and his coworkers are successful in winning over their biggest investor, Maurice Goddard, though the stress of the ongoing investigation lingers on Pierce. Thinking back on anything else that could incriminate him, Pierce recalls when his car was searched and considers the possibility that the police were not responsible. He discovers an unfamiliar keycard in his backpack that accesses a storage unit, as well as a key to a padlock on his keyring. He visits the unit, purchased under his name, and finds Lilly's refrigerated corpse. Realizing that he has been set up but not believing Wentz is responsible, he moves Lilly's body and sets out to find the bigger threat.

Believing that everything has been an act of collusion among competitors to incriminate him and get him out of the race, Pierce drives to his ex Nicole's house and accuses her of having leaked vital information. She denies it before kicking him out. Reflecting on his accusations, Pierce visits Robin, whose real name he learns is Lucy, to make amends, and discovers that she was also battered by Wentz and Six-Eight. Lucy explains that the last time she saw Lilly, there was an unfamiliar car parked in her driveway, and that she believed Wentz's boss Grady was there. Recognizing the description of the car to be that of his friend Cody Zeller, Pierce sets out to confront him. He calls him into Amedeo's laboratory. Locking both Zeller and himself inside, he leads him toward a confession that is captured by an audio recording. Zeller admits that he chose to use Lilly as bait for Pierce, knowing that he would feel a need to find her in order to make up for the death of Pierce's sister Isabelle, a prostitute who was murdered years ago by a serial killer. Pierce had blamed himself for it ever since, as he was unable to persuade her to leave the streets and come home. Zeller also reveals his employers to be Goddard and the pharmaceutical industry, stating that they did not want Amedeo's recipe to be released. Renner arrives, revealed to have given Pierce a wire to get a full confession from Zeller. Before he can arrest him, Wentz and Six-Eight arrive with a security guard as a hostage and a shootout ensues. Six-Eight and Zeller are killed instantly and Renner is injured. Pierce turns off the lights with a voice activated system and grabs Zeller's hidden gun. In one of the lab's rooms, he equips a pair of thermal goggles to navigate the darkness. When Wentz finds him in the dark, Pierce reactivates the lights and shoots him twice in the head, killing him. Pierce finds Renner wounded and helps him call for backup. In the aftermath, while the investigation in the lab goes underway, Pierce discusses with Charlie what the company's next steps should be now that their invention has been officially given the go-ahead. 

Recognizing his reluctance to trust those closest to him, Pierce reaches out to reconcile with Nicole.

2002 American novels
Novels by Michael Connelly